Hydroxycitronellal (7-hydroxy-3,7-dimethyloctanal) is an odorant used in perfumery.  Its molecular formula is C10H20O2.

It derives from a citronellal. 7-Hydroxy-3, 7-dimethyloctanal, also known as 3, 7-dimethyl-7-hydroxyoctan-1-al or 7-hydroxycitronellal, belongs to the class of organic compounds known as medium-chain aldehydes.

It has a sweet floral odor with citrus and melon undertones.

See also
 Citronellal

References

Perfume ingredients
Aldehydes
Tertiary alcohols
Monoterpenes
Sweet-smelling chemicals